Charles Brook may refer to:

Charles Brook, Newfoundland and Labrador
Charles Brook (philanthropist) (1814–1872), English businessman and philanthropist
Charles Wortham Brook (1901–1983), London GP and member of the London County Council

See also
Charles Brooke (disambiguation)
Charles Brooks (disambiguation)

BrookCharles,